Fabrizio Caligara (born 12 April 2000) is an Italian professional footballer who plays as a midfielder for Ascoli.

Club career

Caligara is a youth exponent from Juventus. On 12 September 2017, he made his senior debut for the club in the UEFA Champions League in a 3–0 away loss to Barcelona where he came on as a substitute for Gonzalo Higuaín after 87 minutes. On 1 February 2018, Caligara was signed by Cagliari. On 17 April 2018, he made his senior debut in Serie A, at Stadio San Siro against Inter where he came out as a substitute of Andrea Cossu after 73 minutes.

On 16 August 2018, Caligara joined to Olbia on loan until 30 June 2019.

On 20 July 2019, Caligara joined Serie B side Venezia on loan until 30 June 2020.

On 1 February 2021, Cagliara was loaned to Ascoli in Serie B for the remainder of the 2020–21 season. On 11 August 2021, he returned to Ascoli on a new loan with an obligation to buy.

International career
Caligara has represented Italy at U16, U17 and U19 levels.

Career statistics

Club

References

2000 births
Living people
Italian footballers
Italy youth international footballers
Association football midfielders
Juventus F.C. players
Cagliari Calcio players
Olbia Calcio 1905 players
Venezia F.C. players
Ascoli Calcio 1898 F.C. players
Serie A players
Serie B players
Serie C players
Sportspeople from the Province of Novara
Footballers from Piedmont
People from Borgomanero